For the Winter Olympics, there are 22 venues that have been or will be used for cross-country skiing. The first events took near the main stadium. In 1936, the first efforts to hold all of Nordic skiing (Nordic combined, ski jumping) in one location took place. This was repeated in 1952. For the 1956 games, the venue was among the first in the Winter Olympics to meet the television needs of RAI, Italy's national broadcaster. The 1956 venue was constructed in an oblong  area in an east-west direction with the Grand Stands facing south. A temporary venue was created for the 1960 Games which also included biathlon for the first time. The first permanent Olympic venue in cross-country skiing took place in 1980. For all of Nordic skiing and biathlon, the first time they were in the same location was at the 2010 Games.

References

Venues
 
Cross-country skiing